Betsy Layne High School (BLHS) is a secondary school located in Betsy Layne, Floyd County, Kentucky, United States, and is one of three public high schools in the Floyd County School system.

References

Schools in Floyd County, Kentucky
Public high schools in Kentucky